Hedenham Wood is a  biological Site of Special Scientific Interest north of Hedenham in Norfolk.

Most of this ancient wood on boulder clay is hornbeam coppice with oak standards, but the wet valley bottom has ash, maple and elm. The diverse ground flora includes some uncommon species.

The site is private with no public access.

References

Sites of Special Scientific Interest in Norfolk